Cardiocephalus is an extinct genus of lepospondyl amphibian from the Permian period. It was a member of the family Gymnarthridae.

References

External links
Cardiocephalus fossil pictures.

Gymnarthrids
Cisuralian amphibians of North America
Fossil taxa described in 1904